Dialogue, in literature, is a verbal exchange between two or more characters (but can also involve strategic use of silence). If there is only one character talking aloud, it is a monologue.

Identifiers
"This breakfast is making me sick," George said.

The George said is the identifier. Said is the verb most writers use because reader familiarity with said prevents it from drawing attention to itself. Although other verbs such as ask, shout, or reply are acceptable, some identifiers get in the reader's way. For example:

"Hello," he croaked nervously, "my name's Horace."
"What's yours?" he asked with as much aplomb as he could muster.

Another example is:

"My name is Peg, what's yours?" I asked.
"My name is William, but my friends call me Will," said Will.

Stephen King, in his book On Writing, expresses his belief that said is the best identifier to use. King recommends reading a novel by Larry McMurtry, who he claims has mastered the art of well-written dialogue.

Substitutes are known as said-bookisms. For example, in the sentence "What do you mean?" he smiled, the word smiled is a said-bookism.

See also
 Exposition
 Fiction writing
 Pace
 Show, Don't Tell

Notes

References

External links
 Fiction Writing: Top 8 Tips for Writing Realistic Dialogue
 Tips for Fiction Writers: Dialogue 
 "Stop Using Those Said Bookisms," the Editor Shrieked

Fiction
Style (fiction)
Fiction-writing mode
Narratology
Writing